

House of Oldenburg, Absolute monarchy 1665-1863
Frederick III adopted a Semi-salic law of succession.

House of Glücksburg
With both Frederick VII and his uncle, Ferdinand childless, legislation was passed in 1852 to give the Danish throne to Christian of Schleswig-Holstein-Sonderburg-Glücksburg, a great-grandson of Frederick V. Semi-salic law continued to be used until 1953 when male-preference primogeniture was adopted. This lasted until 2009 when absolute primogeniture was put in place.

Danish monarchy
Lists of Danish people
Danish throne
Danish
Denmark history-related lists